The New Generation Movement or Naway Nwe ( /) is an Iraqi Kurdish political party formed to contest the 2018 general election.

History of the party
The New Generation Movement is a newly founded political party in the Kurdistan Region of Iraq, which was formed in October 2017. The party was founded by Shaswar Abdulwahid,  a businessman and investor in the Kurdistan region. Abdulwahid founded the movement after heading the "No for Now" campaign against the Kurdistan independence referendum in September 2017. The Movement campaigns on a platform of anti-corruption, economic liberalization, and social tolerance.'

Founding of the party
Shaswar Abdulwahid entered politics in 2017, during the Kurdistan Region's independence referendum. He led the "No For Now" campaign, which argued that the timing for the referendum was wrong from a political and economic standpoint.'

In 2017, Shaswar Abdulwahid established the New Generation Movement, which was able to secure four seats in Iraq's Council of Representatives in its first election in May 2018 and eight seats in Kurdistan Parliament in regional elections in September 2018, becoming the fourth largest grouping out of 40 political parties in the Kurdistan Parliament.'

Electoral results 
In the 2021 Iraqi parliamentary election, the movement succeeded in winning 9 seats in the parliament.

Arrest
New Generation leader Shaswar Abdulwahid appeared in court in Sulaimani on 3 March 2019 and arrested after being summoned on charges related to Articles 229 and 434 of the Iraqi penal code.' Shaswar had been previously arrested in 2017 for backing protests.' He and his supporters have argued that these arrests were politically motivated, noting that he has had prominent companies, businesses, and TV channels since 2007 but was not never arrested until 2017 when he became an influential political player on the side of the opposition.'

Kurdistan 2033, New Generation Movement Strategy

The Kurdistan Region stands at a crossroads and the decisions that are made today will have an effect far into the future. To successfully navigate these dangerous times, the Region needs a political movement that envisions a decisive, new future: one that strives to build an inclusive, peaceful, and prosperous Kurdistan where human rights, individual liberties, women's rights, power sharing, economic development, tolerance, and compassion are society's guiding principles. That movement needs to be decisive in its support for these values, eschewing the systems of patronage that are so damaging to society.'

The Kurdistan Region needs to undertake a brave new change, unafraid to take on the large and complicated problems that require constructive dialogue with the Iraqi government. The New Generation Movement can resolve the issues between Erbil and Baghdad and make the Iraqi Constitution for our citizens.'

New Generation will do this in a way that empowers women and girls in political decision-making. Women and girls should not be used to decorate the table of politicians. Their role in decision-making must be equal to that of men.'

In the spirit of transparency and openness, the New Generation Movement is making its policy goals public by releasing this detailed fifteen-year plan. Drawing on the expertise of numerous advisors, this plan outlines three phases of development for the most important parts of our society.'

New Generation will work hard to become the largest party in the Region. For too long, the chaotic multi-party governments have divided the cake of government amongst themselves and, as a result, failed the people. This arrangement enables the old political forces to avoid taking for their own failures. New Generation seeks to form a majority government capable of implementing a cohesive, progressive policy agenda to end that practice.'

Unlike the older parties, New Generation does not look for excuses for its failures or others to blame. It is committed to governing with accountability and transparency. Success or failure would be measured by the welfare of the citizens, not the fortunes of the movement's leadership. If we fail in that regard, we should not remain in power.'

This fifteen-year policy program put forward by the New Generation Movement requires harmony and stability to be successful. Ensuring peace and coexistence is central to this plan. Therefore, as a way of introduction, I would like to discuss these issues in greater detail.'

First, peace within the Kurdistan Region means creating an atmosphere of coexistence and tolerance that ensures a diverse and inclusive society between citizens of different ethnic and religious groups, all holding equal rights and responsibilities. We are all endowed with human rights that stem our common humanity and are not granted on the basis of religion, ethnicity, or gender. We are all citizens of Kurdistan or the people under our protection. The New Generation Movement serves all equally.'

A matter that has particular relevance for the Kurdistan Region is the historical tension between our political parties. While we all have strongly held beliefs and will firmly challenge each other on policy. Nevertheless, we are all also from this region and country. We should respect each other and ensure that our rivalry never reaches a point where we undermine our common identity or depend on external forces to resolve our differences. Developing the homeland is the first and foremost duty of us as citizens and as political parties. Maintaining peace within the borders of the Kurdistan Region is all of our responsibility, regardless of our partisan affiliation.'

Second, in terms of maintaining peace in the disputed territories, no government or military force has been able to resolve the issue using force. The last one who attempted to do so was Saddam Hussein, who failed to impose his will on the area around Kirkuk or on the Kurdistan Region, even with one million fighters and armed men. Peace in this contested zone stems from a commitment to tolerance, political stability, and economic development. Kurds should respect all other ethnicities, religions, and sects in these areas. Providing good governance would demonstrate the positive benefit of living under the umbrella of the Kurdistan Regional Government (KRG). If a referendum were to be held in the future, residents in the disputed areas would want to choose this government freely. Kurds should use a discourse of coexistence.'

Third, in order to have a stable and progressive Kurdistan Region, we need a strong relationship between the Region and Iraq. Our Region stands to benefit from a peaceful, democratic Iraq and we should aim to build a mutually beneficial partnership with the government in Baghdad. War reached our region and thousands of this our sons and daughters became victims. The strategy of the New Generation is for the Region to have a strong and mutually beneficial relationship with a democratic Iraq, where both respect each other's institutions.'

Fourth, New Generation believes that none of the three above-mentioned points can be realized if the Kurdistan Region does not have a good relationship with neighboring countries, especially Iran and Turkey. This relationship must be one based on mutual respect. The fate of the Kurdistan Region is linked to those countries. Successful development of the Region hinges of having positive trade relations and a stable security situation with them. When in power, New Generation will attempt to strengthen these relationships without surrendering any of its autonomy. In exchange, Iran and Turkey should respect the Kurdistan Region, its government, and its people and treat it as a sovereignty entity. Conducting regional relations in this manner is immeasurably preferable to that of the past and it will be the goal of New Generation to do so.'

Political stability and peace leads to economic development: It is an issue of primary importance for the New Generation. because without a strong economy, we cannot realize the true potential of the Kurdistan Region. In the following pages, we outline the policy program of the New Generation Movement. In it we address the issues of the economic well-being of the people and government, the health care and education of its citizens, the environment, and the peshmerga. Without a strong economy, we cannot effectively tackle these issues. Without a healthy, well-educated, verdant, and secure society, we cannot meet our economic potential.'

This fifteen-year plan of the New Generation Movement has been divided into three different phases for each sector: a one-year plan, a four-year plan, and a fifteen-year plan. We have attempted to be as detailed and open as possible, while recognizing that some of the finer points will change as we adapt to new circumstances. Nevertheless, the values inherent to this plan – transparency, good governance, accountability, and stability – will not change. As a new political force, we offer a vision that looks forward to a Kurdistan Region that is stable, progressive, and prosperous and ask the people of Kurdistan to help us meet that goal.'

Controversies
On 22 April 2019, the party's Supreme Council and two prominent members of the Iraqi Parliament, Rabun Maroof and Sarkawt Shamsulddin published a statement on Facebook, which, among others, read 
'The New Generation has been shifted from a political movement different from the dominant political model to a political band in which all of its institutions and the important decision-making bodies have been marginalized.'

They also stated that the New Generation Movement 'no longer enjoys collective decision making'. They accused the party leadership of getting 'involved in business and family to the extent that it is difficult to separate.'

On 25 April 2019, the Supreme Council of the New Generation Movement suspended two of their 'high-profile members' who publicly criticized the party. On the same day, a 'high-level official' of the Movement was arrested by the Sulaymaniyah police, following a complaint by Shadi Nawzad, a New Generation MP in the Kurdistan Parliament. She accused the New Generation Movement's leader, Shaswar Abdulwahid, and some factions within the party of blackmailing her and other lawmakers by circulating nude videos.

Still on the same day, New Generation leader Shaswar Abdulwahid disputed the accusations of mixing the family, politics and business, and accused the dissident members of the party of 'betraying' him, while speaking from London where he received medical care. He also went on rejecting claims about the lack of collective decision making, saying 'Why didn't they say the decisions were unilateral when I made decisions to make them lawmakers and heads of caucuses?'. Furthermore, he stated 'We have seventeen offices within New Generation: none of my family members are in charge of those offices.' He also hinted about possible KDP (Kurdish Democratic Party, the largest party currently in the Kurdistan Parliament) and PUK (Patriotic Union of Kurdistan involvement, the largest party in Iraq's Sulaymaniyah Governorate); 'This is a disgusting plan by both parties in power, which are the Patriotic Union of Kurdistan in Sulaimani and the Kurdistan Democratic Party in Erbil,', he said, adding that he expects 'more [of the same] from both parties in the future,'.

In the following weeks, several members of the movement have been arrested including the secretary of the leader, the director of Nalia group (founded by Abdulwahid) and social media staff  members. Some political parties outside the PUK and KDP condemned the arrests, including the Kurdistan Islamic Group (Komal) the Kurdistan Islamic Union (KIU), and The Freedom Movement of Kurdistan Society (Tevgera Azad).

On 10 May 2019, four arrested members of the New Generation said Abdulwahid ordered them to threaten Shadi Nawzad. They also claimed that the Movement has two social media departments; one that administrates and manages the official social media pages, and the other that uses non-direct accounts and pages to attack political leaders.

On the same day, Abdulwahid reacted with stating that the Sulaymaniyah Asayesh (which detained the party members and released their confessions) are to blame because they want to 'target and defame' the Movement. He added that 'When we took this path we knew that it is a difficult path. We also knew that changing a system or toppling a KDP and PUK establishment in Kurdistan is not easy'. He stated that 'We will continue and not give up'.

On 16 May 2019, the leader of the Movement, Shashwar Abdulwahid was detained after appearing in a Slimani (Sulaymaniyah) court. Earlier that day,  he published a Facebook post, saying 'Concerning the arrest warrant, I am going to court myself as we have done it in the past... What we and our friends suffer is the price of our stances, not a mistake. Many have made big mistakes and committed heinous crimes, but walk freely in this county,', and stated 'Making big changes requires sacrifices, patience and determination. At the end of the day, the one who has faith in his cause will prevail.'. He added that 'We assure everyone that we will not give up and will become stronger,'.

Later, it was stated that Abdulwahid had gone on a hunger strike, with his health 'unstable' by 22 May 2019.

References

2017 establishments in Iraq
Political parties established in 2017
Political parties in Kurdistan Region